Peter John Goegan (March 6, 1934 – October 8, 2008) was a Canadian professional ice hockey defenceman who played 383 games in the National Hockey League (NHL) with the Detroit Red Wings, New York Rangers, and Minnesota North Stars between 1958 and 1968. Goegan recorded 20 goals and 70 assists during his NHL Career.

Playing career
Goegan started playing hockey Fort William, Ontario, and then moved for two seasons to the Northern Ontario Hockey Association before joining professional hockey in 1956.

He played for two years in the American Hockey League (AHL) with the Cleveland Barons, winning a Calder Cup, but in the 1957–58 season he debuted in the NHL with the Detroit Red Wings. In the following seasons he became a defender for the Red Wings, except for a loan to the Edmonton Flyers of the Western Hockey League (WHL) during the 1959-60 championship.

In 1962 he played for a few months in the New York Rangers organization, winning another Calder Cup with the Springfield Indians farm team, but in October he returned to the Red Wings. He split five seasons between the Rangers and another AHL affiliate, the Pittsburgh Hornets, with whom he won the third Calder Cup in his career.

Goegan was selected in the 1967 NHL Expansion Draft by the Minnesota North Stars, with whom he played 46 games in addition to a WHL loan to the Phoenix Roadrunners. He retired a year later in 1969 after playing with the Baltimore Clippers and the Denver Spurs.

Career statistics

Regular season and playoffs

References

External links
 

1934 births
2008 deaths
Baltimore Clippers players
Canadian expatriate ice hockey players in the United States
Canadian ice hockey defencemen
Denver Spurs (WHL) players
Detroit Red Wings players
Edmonton Flyers (WHL) players
Ice hockey people from Ontario
Minnesota North Stars players
New York Rangers players
Phoenix Roadrunners (WHL) players
Pittsburgh Hornets players
Sportspeople from Thunder Bay
Springfield Indians players